The Williams FW27 was the Formula One car which the Williams team used during the 2005 Formula One season.

Design and development

Overview 
Like the Minardi PS05 and the Renault R25, the FW27 utilized a 6-speed gearbox rather than the 7-speed gearbox found on the other 2005 F1 cars.

This car was the last Williams model that was powered by a BMW engine before BMW moved to BMW Sauber and also Michelin tyres before their switch to Bridgestone tyres. The following year's model, the Williams FW28 had an engine provided by Cosworth.

Livery 
BMW-Williams went into 2005 season with renewed major sponsorships such as Allianz, FedEx, HP, Reuters, ORIS, Hamleys, Budweiser, Petrobras and Castrol. BMW-Williams received new sponsorship such as RBS and discontinued sponsorships are NiQuitin Co., CCTV and Shanghai Circuit. The livery was similar to 2004 design with subtle changes.

Variants 
The Williams FW27B was prepared for the purpose of testing the BMW V8 engine for the 2006 season, but Cosworth was ultimately chosen when BMW left Williams to buy the Sauber team. The Williams FW27C was prepared for the purpose of testing the 2006 Cosworth V8 engine.

Racing history
While Williams was able to compete and take a couple of victories home in recent years, the FW27 proved not to be up to the same performance levels as some of the other teams' cars. New drivers Mark Webber and Nick Heidfeld scored points quite frequently, but a Grand Prix win was not within their reach. The highlight was the second and third places in Monaco. Heidfeld also scored a second place at the European race, where he started from pole. From the Italian Grand Prix onwards, Heidfeld, who was injured, was replaced by Antônio Pizzonia, who had previously been Webber's teammate at Jaguar in 2003. The team ended the season winless for the first time since 2000 in fifth place in the Constructors' Championship, failing to meet their own high expectations.

Other use 
In September 2005, future four-time world champion Sebastian Vettel conducted his first ever test in a Formula One car in a Williams FW27.

Complete Formula One results
(key) (results in bold indicate pole position.)

Gallery

References

Williams F1

External links

Williams Formula One cars
2005 Formula One season cars